Jacob Trueman (born 16 February 1999) is an English professional rugby league footballer who plays as a  or  for Hull F.C. in the Super League.

He has previously played for the Castleford Tigers in the Super League and Bradford Bulls in the Championship. He has represented England at international level.

Background
Trueman was born in Bradford, West Yorkshire, England.

Club career

Bradford Bulls
He is a product of the Bradford Bulls Academy and signed his first professional contract in January 2016 with them. Trueman previously played for a local amateur side, West Bowling ARLFC.

He featured in round 13 of the 2016 Bradford Bulls season, against the Swinton Lions.

Castleford Tigers
In January 2017, Trueman was signed by the Castleford Tigers, joining the club on a two-year deal. He made his Super League début on 4 June 2017 against St Helens. He scored a hat-trick in his second Castleford appearance against Wigan Warriors on 17 September. At the end of the season, Trueman was named as the Tigers Academy Players' Player of the Year. In December 2017, Trueman signed a new three-year contract with Castleford, with head coach Daryl Powell labelling him "the most promising half-back in the English game".

Trueman was assigned squad number 21 for 2018. He was utilised in the fullback position for a period, although he made the majority of his appearances at halfback. He performed consistently well throughout the season, cementing his place in the first team by appearing in all but 4 of Castleford's games. Trueman's contributions were reflected in the end-of-season awards, as he was named as Castleford's Young Player of the Year and 2nd place Player of the Year. He also went on to win the Super League Young Player Of The Year 2018. In November, he signed a new four-year contract with the Tigers until the end of 2022.

For the 2019 season, Trueman was given squad number 6, recognising his place in Castleford's first team. Injuries to teammates meant that he wasn't able to form a consistent partnership with any other halfback, starting alongside Jordan Rankin, Paul McShane, Peter Mata'utia, Cory Aston and Jamie Ellis at different points throughout the season. He scored his second hat-trick for Castleford against Hull F.C. on 5 September, to help the Tigers reach the play-offs. He made 31 appearances, missing only 1 game for the Tigers, and scored 8 tries. He finished as a runner-up for Castleford's Player of the Year and Players' Player of the Year awards and was once again nominated for Super League Young Player of the Year.

Trueman was named Man of the Match for his performance against the Toronto Wolfpack in the opening round of the 2020 season. His developing halfback combination with new Tigers signing Danny Richardson was widely lauded as an exciting and potentially long-term partnership for both club and country. Castleford captain Michael Shenton shared this view ("It's exciting. A lot of teams have gone for Australian halves but we've gone for young British halves with plenty of talent.") and spoke very highly of Trueman: "He is a quiet person off the field but on the field we are trying to make him grow because he's unequalled in talent for our team. He's our best player."

On 17 July 2021, he played for Castleford in their 2021 Challenge Cup Final loss against St. Helens.

Hull FC 
On 5 July 2022, it was announced that Trueman would join Hull FC on a three-year deal from the 2023 season.

International career
In July 2018, he was selected in the England Knights Performance squad.

He was selected in England 9s squad for the 2019 Rugby League World Cup 9s.

He was selected in squad for the 2019 Great Britain Lions tour of the Southern Hemisphere.

Statistics 

(* denotes season still competing)

References

External links
 Castleford Tigers profile
 Bradford Bulls profile
 SL profile

1999 births
Living people
Bradford Bulls players
Castleford Tigers players
English rugby league players
Hull F.C. players
Rugby league halfbacks
Rugby league players from Bradford